Michael Hildebrand (died 5 Feb 1509) was a Roman Catholic prelate who served as Archbishop of Riga (1484–1509).

Biography
On 4 Jun 1484, Michael Hildebrand was appointed by Pope Sixtus IV as Archbishop of Riga. On 13 Jun 1484, he was consecrated by Pierre Fridaricus, Bishop of Nisyros, with Bonadias de Nigronibus, Bishop of Isola, and William O’Ferral, Bishop of Ardagh, serving as co-consecrators. He served as Archbishop of Riga until his death on 5 Feb 1509.

References 

1509 deaths
15th-century Roman Catholic archbishops in Livonia
Bishops appointed by Pope Sixtus IV
15th-century jurists
16th-century jurists